Professor  Žarko Korać, Ph.D. (born 9 March 1947 in Belgrade, Serbia, Yugoslavia) is a Serbian psychologist  and politician.
He taught psychology at the  University of Belgrade Faculty of Philosophy and is one of the founders and former president of the Social Democratic Union.

Biography
He was Deputy Prime Minister in the Government of Serbia between 2001 and 2004, and briefly acting Prime Minister (17–18 March 2003), after Prime Minister Zoran Đinđić was assassinated.

Korać is a long time member of the Parliament of Serbia, being part of the LDP-led coalition since 2008.

After May 2012 elections, Korać was elected as Deputy Speaker in the Parliament of Serbia.

References

External links
Professor Korać web page at the University of Belgrade Faculty of Philosophy website
Žarko Korać's webpage at the National Assembly of the Republic of Serbia website
Official website of the Social Democratic Union
Glas javnosti, April 14, 2000
Deputy Speakers at the National Assembly of the Republic of Serbia website

1947 births
Living people
Politicians from Belgrade
Social Democratic Union (Serbia) politicians
Civic Alliance of Serbia politicians
Academic staff of the University of Belgrade
University of Belgrade Faculty of Philosophy alumni
Government ministers of Serbia
Serbian psychologists
People from Belgrade in health professions